The Lumières Award for Best Actor is an annual award presented by the Académie des Lumières since 1996.

Winners and nominees
Winners are listed first with a blue background, followed by the other nominees.

1990s

2000s

2010s

2020s

Trivia

Multiple awards
 2 awards
 Mathieu Amalric
 Benoît Magimel
 Michel Serrault

Multiple nominees
 6 nominations
 Romain Duris

 3 nominations
 Daniel Auteuil
 Gérard Depardieu
 Guillaume Canet
 Vincent Lindon
 Jérémie Renier

 2 nominations
 André Dussollier
 Fabrice Luchini
 François Cluzet
 Gaspard Ulliel
 Guillaume Depardieu
 Jean Dujardin
 Lambert Wilson
 Mathieu Amalric
 Michel Bouquet
 Michel Serrault
 Omar Sy
 Swann Arlaud
 Tahar Rahim
Albert Dupontel

See also
César Award for Best Actor

External links
 Lumières Award for Best Actor at AlloCiné

Actor
 
Film awards for lead actor